Mattaponi is an unincorporated community in King and Queen County, Virginia, United States. The main roads in Mattaponi are SR 33 and SR 605.

Etymology
The town is named after the Mattaponi Powhatan tribe, which has a reservation in the county.

References

Unincorporated communities in Virginia
Unincorporated communities in King and Queen County, Virginia